Celebrity Soup is a weekly comedy series focusing on recaps of various pop culture and reality show television highlights of the week. It was broadcast on E! Entertainment Television and was the UK version of the USA's long-running series The Soup. There were two series aired from 2005–2006.

The series was hosted by Iain Lee who provided sarcastic commentary on the various clips.

The show was filmed on bluescreen at Princess Productions' Bayswater Studios in London.

References

External links
 

2000s British comedy television series
2000s British satirical television series
2005 British television series debuts
2006 British television series endings
British television series based on American television series
E! original programming
Infotainment
English-language television shows